Newcastle is a barony in County Wicklow, Republic of Ireland.

Etymology
Newcastle barony derives its name from the village of Newcastle.

Location

Newcastle barony is located in eastern County Wicklow, opening onto the Irish Sea.

History
The Uí Theig (O'Tighe), cousins to the Uí Máil, are noted early here, as well as the Uí Braen Deilgni, a branch of the Uí Garrchon. This was part of O'Byrne (Ó Broin) country after the 12th century, referred to in Gaelic as Crioch Branach.

List of settlements

Below is a list of settlements in Newcastle barony:
Ashford
Glenealy (northern part)
Kilcoole
Newcastle
Newtownmountkennedy

References

Baronies of County Wicklow